Loznitsa Municipality is a municipality (obshtina) in Razgrad Province, Northeastern Bulgaria, located in the Danubian Plain. It is named after its administrative centre - the town of Loznitsa.

The area contains the Beli Lom Reservoir, developed along the river of the same name. The main road II-49 crosses the municipality from north to south connecting the province centre of Razgrad with the city of Targovishte and respectevly the Danube Bridge with the Kotel pass in the eastern Stara planina mountain.

Settlements 

Loznitsa Municipality includes the following 16 places (towns are shown in bold):

Demography 
The following table shows the change of the population during the last four decades.

Religion 
According to the latest Bulgarian census of 2011, the religious composition, among those who answered the optional question on religious identification, was the following:

See also
Provinces of Bulgaria
Municipalities of Bulgaria
List of cities and towns in Bulgaria

References

External links
 Official website 

Municipalities in Razgrad Province